Tall-e Nemat (also Romanized as Tall-e Neʿmat and Tal-e Neʿmat; also known as Tall-e Shahīd Bāhonar, Shahīd Bāhonar, Tahel, Tal Mīān-e Neʿmat, and Tel) is a village in Shurab Rural District, Veysian District, Dowreh County, Lorestan Province, Iran. At the 2006 census, its population was 187, in 36 families.

References 

Towns and villages in Dowreh County